Redmon & Vale was an American country music duo formed in 1997 by Allison Redmon and Tina Vale, both of whom served as vocalists. They met through a common friend, with whom they initially performed as a trio before deciding to work as a duo instead after the trio split up.

The duo released a self-titled studio album and two singles in 1999 on DreamWorks Records. The album included two singles, both of which charted on the Billboard country charts. Jeffrey B. Remz of Country Standard Time gave the album a negative review, saying that it "mine[d] the generic, overproduced field of bland pop country." A reviewer for The Technique, the student newspaper for the Georgia Institute of Technology, gave the album a more positive review, noting that the two singers seemed to focus more on harmonies than most other country groups. The album's first single, "If I Had a Nickel (One Thin Dime)" reached No. 65 on the country charts, while the second single, "Squeezin' the Love Outta You", peaked at No. 74. The latter was also recorded by Carolyn Dawn Johnson (who co-wrote it) on her 2004 album Dress Rehearsal.

Discography

Track listing 

Track information and credits verified from Discogs, AllMusic, and the album's liner notes.

Singles

Music videos

References

American country music groups
Country music duos
Musical groups established in 1997
DreamWorks Records artists